Pseudotribos ("false chewing") is an extinct genus of mammal that lived in Northern China during the Middle Jurassic some , possibly more closely related to monotremes than to theria (placental and marsupial mammals), although other studies indicate that these shuotheres are closer to therians than to monotremes.  The only known specimen was found in the Daohugou Bed in Inner Mongolia (: paleocoordinates ).

References

External links
 Pseudotribos robustus, ancient Jurassic mammal with new type of teeth

Prehistoric mammal genera
Jurassic mammals of Asia
Fossil taxa described in 2007
Taxa named by Zhe-Xi Luo
Taxa named by Qiang Ji (paleontologist)
Taxa named by Chong-Xi Yuan